

Cabinet

Sources

Government of South Africa
Executive branch of the government of South Africa
Cabinets of South Africa
1943 establishments in South Africa
1948 disestablishments in South Africa
Cabinets established in 1943
Cabinets disestablished in 1948